Hanauer Internationale Amateurtheatertage is a theatre festival in Germany.

Theatre festivals in Germany
Events in Hesse
Culture of Hesse
Hanau